At the 2011 Pan Arab Games, the squash events were held at Khalifa International Complex in Doha, Qatar from 12–15 December. A total of 2 events were contested.

Medal summary

Men

Women

Medal table

References

External links
Squash at official website

Pan Arab Games
Events at the 2011 Pan Arab Games
2011 Pan Arab Games